The 1971 Individual Speedway World Championship was the 26th edition of the official World Championship to determine the world champion rider.

Ole Olsen became the first Danish winner of the Championship. His 15 point maximum denied Ivan Mauger from winning a fourth consecutive title. Mauger won the silver medal run-off against Bengt Jansson.

Format changes
The format of the Championship changed again for the 1971 event. This time the Swedish riders were allowed six places in the World Final to be held in Sweden. All other nations had to go through the European Final route to provide the remaining 10 riders for the World Final.

First round
British/Commonwealth Qualifying - 16 to British/Commonwealth Final
Continental Qualifying - 16 to Continental Final
Swedish Qualifying - 16 to Swedish Finals

British/Commonwealth Qualifying

Swedish Qualifying

Continental Qualifying

Second round
British/Commonwealth Final - 12 to British/Commonwealth/Nordic final
Nordic Final -  4 to British/Commonwealth/Nordic final

British/Commonwealth Final
June 16, 1971
 Coventry
 First 12 to British-Nordic Final

Nordic Final

 June 6, 1971
 Hillerød
 First 4 to British-Nordic Final

Third round
British/Commonwealth/Nordic Final - 8 to European Final
Continental Final - 8 to European Final

British/Commonwealth/Nordic Final
July 30, 1971
 Glasgow
 First 8 to European Final

Continental Final
June 26, 1971
 Slany
 First 8 to European Final plus 1 reserve

Fourth round
European Final - 10 to World Final
Swedish Finals - 6 to World Final

Swedish Finals
Three races held on 1 June at Eskilstuna, 2 June at Norrköping and 3 June in Stockholm

European Final
 August 21, 1971
  Wembley
 First 10 to World Final plus 1 reserve

World Final
September 10, 1971
 Göteborg, Ullevi
Referee:  Georg Traunspurger

Note : Vladimir Gordeev was disqualified after illegal additives were found in his fuel.

References

1971
World Individual
World
Speedway competitions in Poland